Make It Last Forever can refer to:

Make It Last Forever (album), the 1987 album by the R&B artist Keith Sweat
"Make It Last Forever" (song), the 1988 song by the R&B artist Keith Sweat
"Make It Last Forever", a 2006 song by the R&B/pop singer Ciara from the album Ciara: The Evolution
"Make It Last Forever", a 2011 song by Taio Cruz from his album TY.O